The 13th Government of Slovenia was elected on 13 September 2018 by the 8th National Assembly. It is the first minority government in the history of Slovenia. On 27 January 2020, following the resignation of the Minister of Finance Andrej Bertoncelj, Prime Minister Marjan Šarec announced his resignation. The National Assembly was informed on the same day following which the term of the 13th Government ended. Šarec is the third consecutive and in total fourth Prime Minister to resign, before him Miro Cerar, Alenka Bratušek and Janez Drnovšek resigned as well, the latter due to being elected President of the Republic. The 13th Government is the fifth consecutive and eighth government in total to not finish its term.

Formation 
After the 3 June 2018 parliamentary elections, Marjan Šarec, leader of LMŠ, began coalition talks with SD, SMC, SAB and DeSUS. Shortly after that New Slovenia (NSi) joined the talks in order to become the sixth coalition party and ensure a parliamentary majority of at least 46 votes. The newly elected National Assembly held its first session on 22 June 2018 and that meant the first round of the election of Prime Minister began. NSi withdrew from coalition talks on 16 July, close to the expiration of the first round, which meant that for the first time in history there will be no candidate for Prime Minister in the first round of election.

On 27 July 2018, the second round of the election began and parties gathered around Marjan Šarec and LMŠ began talks with The Left, which gradually led to forming a new coalition and government. However, The Left was first negotiating to join the government but later decided to not join it. Membership of the party decided on the internal referendum that the party will support the new government from the opposition.

On 8 August 2018 MPs of LMŠ, SD, SMC, SAB and DeSUS submitted the candidature of Marjan Šarec for the 13th Prime Minister of Slovenia. It was unsure at first whether Šarec has enough votes to be elected, since The Left has not decided if it will support his candidature and government by the time candidature was submitted. On 10 August parties of the coalition and The Left initialed an agreement about cooperation which secured Šarec enough votes for election. On 17 August Šarec was elected Prime Minister, and has 15 days to announce candidates for ministers.

On 20 August leaders of the coalition parties met to decide which ministries will be led by each party:

On 29 August 2018 Marjan Šarec (LMŠ), Dejan Židan (SD), Miro Cerar (SMC), Alenka Bratušek (SAB) and Karl Erjavec (DeSUS) signed coalition agreement and officially formed new government coalition. It was also announced that list of candidates for minister will be submitted to the National Assembly on Friday, 31 August 2018.

On 4 September 2018 National Assembly began with hearings of 16 candidates of ministers. Hearings took place on 5 and 6 September as well. On 5 September Marjan Šarec announced that he will replace Tugomir Kodelja, candidate for Minister of Public Administration, who was already confirmed by the committee, with another candidate. Rudi Medved was announced candidate on 7 September.

On 13 September 2018 13th Government of the Republic of Slovenia was officially elected with 45 votes in favor.

Government coalition 
Government coalition will be formed of five parties and had parliamentary support of an additional party.

Composition

Former members

State Secretaries

Working bodies

Bodies within ministries

Advisory bodies

Timeline

Interpellations

Confirmation process timeline

Cabinet

Minister of Agriculture, Forestry and Food 
It was very clear from the beginning of the negotiations that DeSUS will take over Ministry of Agriculture, Forestry and Food. SD stated that they do not want to take over the Ministry after Dejan Židan led it in the Pahor, Bratušek and Cerar government. There were some speculations that SMC's Zdravko Počivalšek might become minister if SMC will not take over Ministry of Economy.

Candidates

Minister of Culture 
Social Democrats was the only party that publicly showed their interest to take over Ministry of Culture.

Candidates

Minister of Defence 
Karl Erjavec was seen as a candidate for Minister of Defence from the beginning of the negotiations.

Candidates

Minister of Economic Development and Technology 
Ministry of Economic Development and Technology was wanted by both, SMC and SD. Some seen this as a potential reason for Šarec failure to form the government if he will not be able to find the consensus between the parties. In the end SMC got the ministry.

Candidates

Minister of Education, Science and Sport 
SD expressed its will to take over the ministry. At some point it was reported that SMC will take over the ministry, but in the end it was SD, who got the ministry.

Candidates

Minister of Environment and Spatial Planning 
At the beginning it was announced that SAB will take over the ministry, but later leaders of the parties announced that SMC will take it over.

Candidates

Minister of Finance 
Alenka Bratušek expressed her readiness to take over Ministry of Finance, but later become clear that LMŠ will take the ministry, since they will lead the government. Vojmir Urlep was seen as a candidate at first, but later Marjan Šarec stated that he is satisfied with the work of Mateja Vraničar Erman.

Candidates

Minister of Foreign Affairs 
Many have seen Miro Cerar as potential Foreign minister before the election. Cerar declined it at first, since he wanted to become Speaker of the National Assembly. Later it became clear that SD will get the position of the Speaker and that Miro Cerar is willing to take over Ministry of Foreign Affairs.

Candidates

Minister of Health 
Candidates

Minister of Infrastructre 
At the beginning of the negotiations, SMC and SD wanted the ministry. In the end SAB got the ministry.

Candidates

Minister of Interior 
Candidates

Minister of Justice 
Candidates

Minister of Labour, Family, Social Affairs and Equal Opportunities 
Candidates

Minister of Public Administration 
Candidates

Minister without portfolio for Slovenian diaspora 
Candidates

Minister without Portfolio responsible for Development, Strategic Projects and Cohesion 
Candidates

See also 

 List of governments of Slovenia
National Security Council (Slovenia)

References 

Cabinets of Slovenia
Cabinets established in 2018
8th National Assembly (Slovenia)